Maki (also Romanized as Makkī) is a village in Barkuh Rural District, Kuhsorkh County, Razavi Khorasan Province, Iran. At the 2006 census, its population was 1,474, in 375 families.

References 

Populated places in Kuhsorkh County